An unfair list (strike list or do not work order) is a list compiled by trade unions of employers who have engaged in unfair or strike-worthy labor practices, including:

 Refusing to engage in collective bargaining negotiations with a trade union
 Refusing to sign applicable collective bargaining agreements (including MBAs)
 Failing to participate in grievance and arbitration procedures
 Failing to abide by the final award of an arbitrator
 Violating labor laws

Typically, for purposes of solidarity, union members are prohibited by union bylaws from engaging in a contract for the rendering of services to entities that are on the unfair list.

References

Trade unions